Henri Devroye (21 October 1884 – 4 April 1955) was a Belgian racing cyclist. He rode in the 1920 Tour de France.

References

1884 births
1955 deaths
Belgian male cyclists
Place of birth missing